Marcelo Daniel Marques Santiago (born 18 March 1988) is a Portuguese football midfielder who plays for Beira-Mar.

Club career
Born in São João de Loure, Albergaria-a-Velha Municipality, he played in the youth team of S.C. Beira-Mar before moving to F.C. Porto where he played in the youth teams (U-19) between 2005 and 2007.  In the season 2007–08 he made his debut as a senior in Spain playing with Pontevedra CF B team in the Spanish Third League.  The following season, he returned to Portugal and played the next 4 seasons in the Second Division B with 4 different clubs in each season, respectively S.C. Espinho, F.C. Pampilhosa, Gondomar S.C. and C.D. Tondela.  In summer 2012 he moved abroad again, this time to Serbia, by signing with FK Jagodina.  He failed to make any appearance in the Serbian SuperLiga and during the winter break he returns to Portugal and joins second level side Associação Naval 1º de Maio.

National team
Marcelo represented Portugal at U-17, U-18 and U-19 levels.

References

1988 births
People from Albergaria-a-Velha
Living people
Portuguese footballers
Portuguese expatriate footballers
Association football midfielders
Liga Portugal 2 players
Campeonato de Portugal (league) players
S.C. Espinho players
FC Pampilhosa players
Gondomar S.C. players
C.D. Tondela players
Associação Naval 1º de Maio players
FK Jagodina players
C.D. Feirense players
AD Oliveirense players
C.D. Estarreja players
Anadia F.C. players
R.D. Águeda players
SC São João de Ver players
Portuguese expatriate sportspeople in Spain
Portuguese expatriate sportspeople in Serbia
Expatriate footballers in Spain
Expatriate footballers in Serbia
Sportspeople from Aveiro District